The Chugiak-Eagle River Chinooks are a college summer baseball club in the Alaska Baseball League (ABL). The Chinooks are based in Chugiak, Alaska, United States. The team is operated by Athletes in Action. They won their first ABL Championship in 2007. Until 2010 the team was based out of Fairbanks under the name AIA Fire. The team relocated to Chugiak in 2011.

Notable alumni

 Josh Donaldson
 Kirk Nieuwenhuis
 Conner Menez

References

External links
 https://web.archive.org/web/20150923201924/http://www.cerchinooks.com/about/abl-history/
 http://www.cerchinooks.com/roster/

Alaska Baseball League
Amateur baseball teams in Alaska
2010 establishments in Alaska
Baseball teams established in 2010
Baseball teams in Alaska